Military chocolate may refer to:

 Military chocolate (Switzerland)
 Military chocolate (United States)

See also
 Chocolate (disambiguation)